Irving Jassiel García Gaxiola (born March 14, 1991, in Ahome, Sinaloa) is a Mexican professional footballer who currently plays for Murciélagos

References

1991 births
Living people
Mexican footballers
Murciélagos FC footballers
Ascenso MX players
Liga Premier de México players
Tercera División de México players
People from Ahome Municipality
Footballers from Sinaloa
Association footballers not categorized by position